Fatal Promise is a 2020 South Korean television series starring Park Ha-na, Go Se-won, Kang Sung-min and Park Young-rin. The Mega Monster-produced series, directed by Kim Shin-il and written by Ma Ju-hee, revolves around revenge of a girl who was unjustly  sacrificed, by a man to save his family in exchange for injustice and compromise to reality. The daily drama was premiered on KBS2 on March 30, 2020 and aired every weekday at 19:50 (KST) till August 28, 2020.

Synopsis
The drama is a fierce sensibility melodrama. Cha Eun-dong, an upright citizen who has stood up against injustice. Coming from humble beginnings, she has also practiced patience. Unfortunately one day her family is cast into turbulence after she is betrayed by the one person she confides in. Brutally deceived, she is reborn by the burning fire of vengeance as she swears retribution. In contrast, Kang Tae-in has always been a rational man of morals who has always kept his word. Starting as a lowly employee to now the chairman of F Sports Group, he has only depended on himself for a better life. The one promise he has broken was the one he made to Eun Dong, after having to choose between her and his chance for opulence. The two people meet again seven years later.

Cast and characters
The cast and characters of the series are:
Main
 Park Ha-na as Cha Eun-dong
 Yoo Chae-yeon as child Cha Eun-dong 
She is the daughter of a security worker who was a former Catholic priest who lost everything in the face of injustice . It was a'trouble maker' that unintentionally caused a disturbance over the overflowing sense of justice from an early age.
 Go Se-won as Kang Tae-in
F-Sports Group director who is cold-hearted / A man who compromised with reality for his family. Grown up as the son of an ordinary family, he rose from the F-Sports group's lower end staff to executive positions with only one skill. He has even received the credentials of the chairman with his cool reason and thorough judgment. However, Choi Joon-hyuk's strategy leads to being driven to the end of the cliff, and eventually, he abandons his promise with Cha Eun-dong and compromises with reality. Kang Tae-in, suffering from guilt, has never forgotten her. Seven years later, she appears in front of him in anger, and the sealed Pandora's box opens.
 Kang Sung-min as Choi Jun-hyuk
F Sports Group Legal Affairs Team Leader. Son of Juran, Chairman of the Korean Hospital Medical Foundation, who shook everyone's lives with dangerous transactions . F Sports Group Chairman Kwang-Hoon-han is a family. However, his credibility is toward college classmate Kang Tae-in, and his case with him is on the brink of confrontation. Then, in the wake of an incident, he makes a dangerous proposal that cannot be resisted to Kang Tae-in's fiancée Oh Hye-won, which completely transforms the lives of three people Cha Eun-dong, Kang Tae-in, and Oh Hye-won.
 Park Young-rin as Oh Hye-won
Korea Hospital Thoracic and Cardiovascular Surgeon and fiancée of Kang Tae-in, a person who is shaken in front of desire at every moment. She promised to marry Kang Tae-in, who had been a lover since college. Born in a poor family. She was about to take office as a thoracic surgeon, but she is in danger of losing everything she had accumulated unjustly. And at the end of the cliff, Choi Jun-hyuk proposes a risky deal, and there is a conflict between love and ambition.
 Lee Chang-wook as Han Ji-hoon
 Ki Eun-yoo as child Han Ji-hoon
Son of F Sports Group Chairman/ Son of Geum Soo-jeo, Chairman of F Sports Group, who has consistently pure love. He was born with a silver spoon and grew up without any shortcomings, but he was Han-Liang who caused all kinds of accidents when he was in school due to resentment and wounds toward his father. His life, which couldn't be found at all as serious, completely changes when he meets Cha Eun-dong. Whenever it was difficult, he became the only resting place for her, and he later confronts Kang Tae-in fiercely over Cha Eun-dong.

Supporting

People around Cha Eun-dong 
 Lee Dae-yeon as Cha Man-jong, Cha Eun-dong father, a former priest, he got a job as a security officer at the hospital where Hye-won works, and he faced a mysterious accident there. (Special appearance)
 Yoo Jun-seo as Cha Eun-chan, Eun-dong's younger brother.
 Yu Ji-yeon as Kong Young-sim, Eun-dong's close bloody sister, girlfriend of Bong Seok-gu
 Hyun Cheol-ho as Bong Seok-gu, due to the former lawyer Lee Chang-wook, live as a family and calls Eun-dong his sister-in-law.

People around Kang Tae-in

People around Han Ji-hoon

People around Oh Hye-won
 Yoon Bok-in as Go Jae-sook - Hye-won's mother

Original soundtrack

Part 1

Part 2

Part 3

Part 4

Ratings

Awards and nominations

Notes

References

External links
  
 
 

Korean Broadcasting System television dramas
2020 South Korean television series debuts
2020 South Korean television series endings
Korean-language television shows
Television series by Mega Monster
South Korean melodrama television series